Zakho, also spelled Zaxo is a city in the Kurdistan Region of Iraq, at the centre of the eponymous Zakho District of the Dohuk Governorate, located a few kilometers from the Iraq–Turkey border.

The population of the town rose from about 30,000 in 1950 to 350,000 to 1992 due to Kurds fleeing other areas of the country.

The original settlement may have been on a small island in the Little Khabur river, which flows through the modern city. The Khabur flows west from Zakho to form the border between Iraq and Turkey, continuing into the Tigris. The most important rivers in the area are the Zeriza, Seerkotik and the aforementioned Little Khabur.

History

Gertrude Bell, the renowned British archaeologist and Arabist who advised British governors in the region in the closing years of the British Mandate, was convinced that Zakho was the same place as the ancient town of Hasaniyeh. She also reported that one of the first Christian missionaries to the region, the Dominican monk Poldo Soldini, was buried there in 1779. His grave was still a pilgrimage destination in the 1950s.

The town is also the site of Zakho castle, of which today only the tower remains, and of Qubad Pasha castle, a hexagonal structure in Zakho cemetery.

According to an oral tradition transmitted by a Jewish informant from Zakho, Me'allim Levi, Zakho was established in 1568 by Slivani tribesmen, whose territory was stretched south of the location of the town. The family of Shamdin Agha came originally from the Slivani tribe, settled in Zakho, and became the most prominent family in Zakho. From the late 19th century onwards, the family of Shamdin Agha ruled "all the Muslims, Jews and Christians of Zakho and its surroundings." Zakho was known to the ancient Greeks. In 1844, the traveller William Francis Ainsworth commented: "The appearance of Zakho in the present day coincides in a remarkable manner with what it was described to be in the time of Xenophon."

Zakho is a major marketplace with its goods and merchandise serving the Kurdish-controlled area and most of north and central Iraq. Writing in 1818, Campanile described the town as a great trading centre, famous for its gallnuts as well as rice, oil, sesame, wax, lentils and many fruits.

Recent history 

Due to its strategic location and the abundance of job opportunities, Zakho has attracted many workers and job seekers from different parts of Iraq and even from Syria and Turkey. Trade with Turkey is now the major element of the economy. Oil drilling began in 2005.

Islamic history
In Islamic history it is perhaps best remembered as the location of the Battle of the Zab between the Umayyads and the Abbasids.

The river forms the approximate political boundary of Kurdistan Regional Government area of Iraq today. Its sister, the Little (or Lower) Zab rises in north-western part of Kurdistan province Iran, in the north of Piranshahr city and flows south-west through Iraq to join the Tigris north of the town of Baiji. The Dukan Dam straddles the Little Zab some 150 miles upstream from its confluence with the Tigris River. Constructed between 1954 and 1959, the dam has a total discharge capability of 4,300 cms. The power station, constructed in 1979, holds five water turbines and provides 400 MW of electrical energy.

In 1991, Zakho was the centre of the haven established by the British and the Americans in Operation Provide Comfort to protect the Iraqi Kurds from being massacred by Saddam Hussein when he responded brutally to the Kurdish rebellion. Most of the inhabitants of the city had fled to the mountains. When the American forces arrived, they described the town as a ghost city.

The 27 February 1995 Zakho bombing killed over 50 people. When the U.S. Army closed its military base in Zakho in 1996, they evacuated several thousand Kurds who had connections to the base and who feared reprisals. Many of them were given asylum in the USA. According to David McDowall, this constituted a sudden brain drain, with Zakho losing many of its most educated citizens.

In 2008 it was reported that the Turkish Army maintained four bases in Zakho District, under an agreement concluded with the Iraqi Government in the 1990s.

The 2011 Dohuk riots, which targeted Assyrian-owned businesses, were sparked by Muslim clerics in the town.

Christianity

The city was the center of a large Chaldean Catholic diocese up until the middle of the nineteenth century, when it was divided into three dioceses: Amadia, Zakho, and Akra-Zehbar. The Armenians of Zakho established their community after the Armenian genocide, with the first Armenian church in the city being established in 1923.

Judaism

Zakho was formerly known for its synagogues and large, ancient Jewish community and was known as "The Jerusalem of Kurdistan." The banks of the nearby Khabur River are mentioned in the Bible as one of the places to which the Israelites were exiled (1 Chronicles, 5:26, 2 Kings 17:6, 2 Kings 18:11).

The Jews spoke the Jewish Neo-Aramaic dialect of Zakho and were also fluent in Kurmanji, the language spoken by non-Jewish Kurds.

Kurdish society was primarily a tribal one. The Jews of Zakho bore arms like Kurdish Muslims. There was an attack on the Jews in 1891, when one of the synagogues was burnt down. The troubles intensified in 1892.

Most of the Jews relocated to Israel in the 1950s. While the Jews of Zakho were among the least literate in the diaspora, they had a unique and rich oral tradition, known for its legends, epics and ballads, whose heroes came from both Jewish and Muslim traditions.

Climate
Zakho has a hot-summer Mediterranean climate (Csa in the Köppen climate classification) with very hot and dry summers, and cool winters with high rainfall.

Landmarks

One of Zakho's famous landmarks is the Delal Bridge, made of stone.

Zakho Castle lies in the city centre on the western bank of the Khabur. It served as the governor's house in the reign of the Badinan Emirate and was enlarged by Prince Ali Khan. It was built on the ruins of an older castle. Today, only the castle's tower remains.

The Qubad Pasha Castle, in Zakho's cemetery, is hexagonal, with six windows and an entrance gate.

Population displacements 
In 2007, the UNHCR reported that there were still 10,000 internally displaced persons in the Zakho district as a result of the Iraq War.

Sports 
Zakho Football Club (Zakho FC) was founded in 1987. The sports club plays in the Iraqi Premier League, where only the top 16 Iraqi football clubs play. Zakho FC has its own stadium with a capacity of 20,000 seats.

Zakho Basketball Club (Zakho SC) won the Kurdistan Basketball Super Cup and beat Duhok SC in Erbil.

Notable people
Yona Sabar (b. 1938), Jewish scholar
Yitzhak Mordechai (b. 1944), Israeli former general and politician
Louis Raphaël I Sako (b. 1948), Chaldean Catholic Patriarch of Babylon
Erdewan Zaxoyî (1957–1986), Kurdish singer
Eyaz Zaxoyî (1960–1986), Kurdish singer

See also 
 Assyrians in Iraq
 List of largest cities in Iraq
 Zakho (Chaldean Diocese)
 Zambil Frosh
 Yazidis in Iraq
 Zakho resort attack

References

Sources

External links
 Iraq Image - Zakho Satellite Observation

 
District capitals of Iraq
Assyrian communities in Iraq
Cities in Iraqi Kurdistan
Populated places in Dohuk Province
Kurdish settlements in Iraq
Historic Jewish communities in Iraq
Yazidi populated places in Iraq